Events from the year 1673 in Ireland.

Incumbent
Monarch: Charles II

Events
 June – Peter Talbot, Roman Catholic Archbishop of Dublin and Primate of Ireland, goes into exile.
 Parliament of England votes an annual Regium Donum to augment the stipends of Presbyterian clergy in Ireland.

Births
 date unknown – George Wade, British army officer (d. 1748)

Deaths
 February 9 – James Barry, 1st Baron Barry of Santry, lawyer (b. 1603)
 June 6 – James Hamilton, British army officer (b. c.1620)

References

 
1670s in Ireland
Ireland
Years of the 17th century in Ireland